"To Love and Die in Dixie"  is the 12th episode of the third season of the animated comedy series Family Guy. Country music singer Waylon Jennings, who died three months after the episode aired on television in the United States, guest-stars in his last appearance on the show. Dakota Fanning also guest starred on the episode. The title is a reference to a line in the traditional Southern song "Dixie".

The episode was written by future showrunner Steve Callaghan, and was directed by Dan Povenmire. It features the first appearance of the recurring character John Herbert, an elderly pedophile with a perpetual lust for Peter and Lois' teenage son Chris Griffin.

Plot
Needing extra money, Chris decides to get a newspaper route, to help pay for a birthday gift for a girl he likes. Among those on his paper route is an old man named Herbert who is sexually attracted to Chris. Chris later gives his crush a present, but his clumsiness and over-eagerness scares her off. Nevertheless, he decides to retain the paper route. Shortly thereafter, however, Chris witnesses a robbery at a convenience store, and his bike ends up being stolen by the burglar as a getaway vehicle (even though he takes the bike but runs on foot). Later, at the police station, Chris identifies the thief from a police lineup. However, Peter shows up and tells the thief (unknowingly) that he is here to pick up Chris who was going to "finger the guy who held up the convenience store" and then proceeds to give the thief a picture of Chris, along with various other personal information. When the thief escapes and swears vengeance on Chris, the family is placed in the Witness Protection Program where they are relocated to Bumblescum, a tiny town in the deep South, to which Meg complains, although Lois remains somewhat optimistic.

Deciding to embrace the South, Peter decorates his car like the General Lee, though he fails to roll the passenger window down for Brian when beckoning him to enter. He then becomes sheriff with Brian as his deputy, although the two neglect their responsibilities in order to drink. Stewie joins a hillbilly jug band, Meg becomes the most successful and popular student among her classmates (besting Oinky the Pig), and Chris makes a new friend named Sam.

Later, when Peter interferes with a Civil War reenactment, claiming the North won the war, despite how they were being portrayed in the play, Sam's dad says Chris and Sam can no longer be friends and Peter and Brian have to answer to the civil war survivors. Not knowing of this, Sam unexpectedly kisses Chris, and Chris assumes Sam is gay. As Chris writes in a journal about what happened with Sam, Brian hears the story (as Chris was speaking out what he wrote), and he explains that kissing Sam seemingly felt right.

When the two meet again, Chris explains to Sam that even though he is flattered that Sam likes him, he is not interested in a romantic relationship and feels that they are probably better off as just friends. Just before the two go swimming, Chris finds out that Sam is a girl, and due to his bad experiences around girls, Chris now feels awkward around Sam. At a party that is held that night, Sam explains to Chris that he had no problem talking to her, when he thought she was a guy, so she tells Chris to think of her as a boy who he can make out with.

After the FBI agents who were hired to look over the Griffins home in Quahog accidentally reveal the location of the family (telling the criminal where Meg was, but not Chris), the criminal tracks the family down in Bumblescum, and attempts to kill Chris. During the confrontation, however, the criminal is shot and killed by Sam's father.

With the criminal gone, the Griffins return to Quahog with Chris having to leave Sam behind. Once they are home, they realize that someone had left 113 messages on their answering machine, all of which turn out to be from Herbert, who is looking for Chris.

Production

Dan Povenmire, who directed the episode, was granted substantial creative freedom by series creator and executive producer Seth MacFarlane. Povenmire recalled that MacFarlane would tell him "We've got two minutes to fill. Give me some visual gags. Do whatever you want. I trust you." Povenmire praised this management style for letting him "have fun." Povenmire brought realism, and material from his own experiences, to the visual direction of Family Guy.

For this episode, Povenmire drew inspiration from his own childhood in the deep south for a sequence for a background scene where a "redneck" character nonchalantly kicks a corpse into the nearby river. Also, there was a running gag of raccoons jumping out of things and scratching Peter in the face.

In addition to the regular cast, actors Brian Dunkleman and Kathleen Wilhoite, voice actors Dakota Fanning, Harland Williams, and Rachael MacFarlane, and singer Waylon Jennings, guest starred in the episode. Recurring guest voice actors and writers Mike Henry and Danny Smith made minor appearances.

References
General
 Callaghan, Steve (2005). Family Guy: The Official Episode Guide Seasons 1–3. Orion Books. .

Specific

External links

 

Family Guy (season 3) episodes
2001 American television episodes
Southern United States in fiction
Television episodes about witness protection